Al-Malik al-Manṣūr Nūr al-Dīn Abū al-Fatḥ ‘Umar ibn ‘Alī ibn Rasūl was the first Rasulid Sultan of Yemen, from 1228 to 1249.

Emir of Mecca
In the month of Rabi' al-awwal 619 AH (April/May 1222) al-Mas'ud Yusuf captured Mecca from Hasan ibn Qatadah. After the Hajj was complete (in January/February 1223) he returned to Yemen and left Nur al-Din Umar as his deputy in Mecca with a contingent of three hundred horsemen. In 625 AH (1228) al-Mas'ud recalled him to Yemen and appointed in his place Husam al-Din Yaqut.

References

13th-century monarchs in the Middle East
Rasulid dynasty
13th-century Arabs